The mathematician Shmuel Aaron Weinberger (born February 20, 1963) is an American topologist. He completed a PhD in mathematics in 1982 at New York University under the direction of Sylvain Cappell. Weinberger was, from 1994 to 1996, the Thomas A. Scott Professor of Mathematics at the University of Pennsylvania, and he is currently the Andrew MacLeish Professor of Mathematics and chair of the Mathematics department at the University of Chicago.

His research interests include geometric topology, differential geometry, geometric group theory, and, in recent years, applications of topology in other disciplines. He has written a book on topologically stratified spaces and a book on the application of mathematical logic to geometry.

He has given the Porter lectures at Rice University (2000), the Jankowski memorial lecture of the Polish Academy of Sciences (2000), the Zabrodsky Memorial lecture at Hebrew University (2001), the Cairns lectures at University of Illinois at Urbana-Champaign (2002), the Marker lectures in Mathematics at Penn State University (2003), the Lewis Lectures at Rutgers University (2004), the Blumenthal Lectures at Tel Aviv University (2005), the Hardy Lectures of the London Mathematical Society (2008), the William Benter Lecture at the City University of Hong Kong (2010), the Clifford Lectures at Tulane University (2012), the Minerva Lectures at Princeton University (2017) and the Abraham Robinson lecture at Yale (2019). In addition he has given invited lectures at the International Congress of Mathematicians in Zürich (1994), a mini-symposium at the European Congress of Mathematics (2008), the American Mathematical Society (1989), the Canadian Mathematical Society (2006), the Association for Symbolic Logic (2001), and Pembroke Pines Charter High School (2021).

In 2012, he was elected to the first class of AMS fellows.  In 2013, he was elected as a fellow of AAAS.

Selected publications
Books

Research articles

References

External links 
 Shmuel Weinberger's homepage

20th-century American mathematicians
Topologists
University of Chicago faculty
University of Pennsylvania faculty
Mathematicians at the University of Pennsylvania
Jewish American scientists
Fellows of the American Mathematical Society
1963 births
Living people
Courant Institute of Mathematical Sciences alumni
21st-century American mathematicians
21st-century American Jews